John Darroch (28 January 1871 – 24 November 1949), sometimes known as Johnny Darroch, Joe Darroch or Jack Darroch, was a Scottish professional footballer who played as a full back for a number of clubs in the Football League and Scottish League.

Career 
A full back, Darroch played in the Football League for The Wednesday, Bury and Blackburn Rovers and was a part of Bury's 1899–1900 FA Cup-winning team. He also played in the Scottish League for Dundee and Vale of Leven. Darroch joined Dundee Hibernian at the beginning of the 1910–11 season, but made no competitive appearances and was released in April 1911. During the First World War he played for Dainty's XI, a charity team organised by his former Dundee teammate Herbert Dainty.

Personal life 
Between the end of his football career and his death in 1949, Darroch emigrated to the United States. At the time of his death in November 1949, he was living in Dundee.

Career statistics

Honours 
Bury

 FA Cup: 1899–1900

References

Scottish footballers
Sheffield Wednesday F.C. players
Bury F.C. players
Blackburn Rovers F.C. players
Dundee F.C. players
English Football League players
1871 births
1949 deaths
Renton F.C. players
Vale of Leven F.C. players
People from Alexandria, West Dunbartonshire
Footballers from West Dunbartonshire
Dumbarton F.C. players
Dundee United F.C. players
Scottish Football League players
Association football fullbacks
Scottish emigrants to the United States
FA Cup Final players